Miss USA 1976 was the 25th Miss USA pageant, televised live by CBS from Niagara Falls, New York on May 15, 1976.

The pageant was won by Barbara Peterson of Minnesota, who was crowned by outgoing titleholder Summer Bartholomew of California.  Peterson was the first – and to date only – woman from Minnesota to win the Miss USA title, and went on to participate at Miss Universe 1976, where she became the first Miss USA titleholder to fail to advance to the semi-final stage of the pageant.

Results

Special awards

Historical significance 
 Minnesota wins competition for the first time. Also becoming in the 18th state who does it for the first time.
 Michigan earns the 1st runner-up position for the first time.
 Oregon earns the 2nd runner-up position for the first time and it reaches it highest placement ever at the contest.
 South Carolina earns the 3rd runner-up position for the first time.
 Louisiana earns the 4th runner-up position for the first time.
 States that placed in semifinals the previous year were California, Missouri and Texas.
 California placed for the twentieth consecutive year.
 Missouri placed for the third consecutive year. 
 Texas made their second consecutive placement.
 Illinois and Louisiana last placed in 1974.
 Michigan, New Mexico and South Carolina last placed in 1972.
 Georgia, Oregon and Washington last placed in 1970.
 Minnesota last placed in 1954.
 North Carolina breaks an ongoing streak of placements since 1974.
 District of Columbia breaks an ongoing streak of placements since 1970.
 Florida breaks an ongoing streak of placements since 1969.

Delegates
The Miss USA 1976 delegates were:

 Alabama - Kyle Ellis
 Alaska - Elizabeth Staib
 Arizona - Curvy Walters
 Arkansas - Sonia Jines
 California - Joan Pennock
 Colorado - Patricia Swean
 Connecticut - Rozalyn Raplh
 Delaware - Debbie Kucher
 District of Columbia - Nancy Stitt
 Florida - Leigh Walsh
 Georgia - Liz Wickersham
 Hawaii - Brenda Texeira
 Idaho - Cheryl Gilbert
 Illinois - Kathy Schmalen
 Indiana - Annette Anderson
 Iowa - Sheri Davenport
 Kansas - Debbie Viter
 Kentucky - Connie Clark
 Louisiana - Robyn Sanders
 Maine - Dawn St Clair
 Maryland - Linda Potter
 Massachusetts - Holly Hoyle
 Michigan - Kevin Gale
 Minnesota - Barbara Peterson
 Mississippi - Teresa Camp
 Missouri - Donna Hibbits
 Montana - Teresa Klaus
 Nebraska - Catherine Fricke
 Nevada - Janice Carrell
 New Hampshire - Sinceree Rowlette
 New Jersey - Ginger Hagaman
 New Mexico - Jonelle Bergquist
 New York - Carol Doerr
 North Carolina - Dianne Bowen
 North Dakota - Linda Paulson
 Ohio - Karen Myers
 Oklahoma - Lori Hansen
 Oregon - Gail Atchison
 Pennsylvania - Marcy Zambelli
 Rhode Island - Kathy Confreda
 South Carolina - Virginia Murray
 South Dakota - Dorothy Westphal
 Tennessee - Jana Kerr
 Texas - Candace Gray
 Utah - Debbie Drecksel
 Vermont - Susan Parsons
 Virginia - Donna Dixon
 Washington - Norene Gilbert
 West Virginia - Cheryl Plants
 Wisconsin - Susan Femrite
 Wyoming - Murlie Colosky

Judges
Richard Adler
Ernest Borgnine - award-winning actor
Maggie Daly
Sue Downey - Miss USA 1965
Barry Farber
Alice Faye
Melanie Kahane
Derek Sanderson
Zoltan "Zoli" Rendessy

External links 
 
 Miss USA 1976 Judges
 Barbara Peterson at Miss Universe 1976

1976
May 1976 events in the United States
1976 beauty pageants
1976 in New York (state)